The Vidalia Micropolitan Statistical Area, as defined by the United States Census Bureau, is an area consisting of two counties in Georgia (Montgomery and Toombs), anchored by the city of Vidalia, the largest city in Toombs County.

As of the 2000 census, the μSA had a population of 34,337 (though a July 1, 2009 estimate placed the population at 36,889).

Counties
Montgomery
Toombs

Communities
Cities
Ailey
Lyons
Mount Vernon
Santa Claus
Vidalia (Principal city)
Uvalda
Towns
Alston
Higgston
Village 
Tarrytown

Demographics
As of the census of 2000, there were 34,337 people, 12,796 households, and 8,888 families residing within the μSA. The racial makeup of the μSA was 69.30% White, 24.90% African American, 0.17% Native American, 0.40% Asian, 0.01% Pacific Islander, 4.57% from other races, and 0.65% from two or more races. Hispanic or Latino of any race were 7.52% of the population.

The median income for a household in the μSA was $28,526, and the median income for a family was $36,448. Males had a median income of $27,280 versus $19,697 for females. The per capita income for the μSA was $14,217.

See also

Georgia census statistical areas

References

 
Geography of Toombs County, Georgia
Geography of Montgomery County, Georgia